Freeloader is a game published by Cheapass Games. The object of the game is to mooch as much free stuff as possible off of your friends and neighbours.

Gameplay
Freeloader comes with a set of 6 cardboard board pieces which are arranged in a circle. Each card is a house around the neighborhood. The houses belong to a doctor, a gambler, a hippie, an artist, a lawyer, and a waitress.  Players move around the neighborhood by rolling dice. On any turn they can also choose to do a favor for someone - this is noted by them placing one of their tokens on that person's house.  They can also choose at any time to draw a card instead of moving.  The cards in their hand represent the things which they have their eye on.  On their turn a player may also choose to trade in some of their favors for an item in their hand, playing it down onto the table into their "stuff".  Each item costs a certain number of favors, and there are discounts depending on the house they borrow from and if they are the best friend of its owner.  For example, the silk tie costs less if you are the lawyers best friend, while the leftover pork costs less if you are at the waitresses house.

The game ends when the last card is drawn.  At this time only those players who have mooched food, clothing, and shelter can win.  Amongst those the player with the most points win (each item is worth a certain number of points).  This can lead to cutthroat strategy.  For example, your opponent may have 20 more points than you, but if you can take away his only shelter item he does not qualify to win.

Each card in the deck is illustrated, and most contain humorous diary entries about them.

The game itself is published under the Cheapass Games philosophy of not including unnecessary pieces.  This means you will need to provide your own playing pieces, tokens and dice (which can usually be borrowed from other games).

A typical game of Freeloader takes 1 to 1.5 hours to play.

Reviews
Pyramid
Games # 189 (Vol 27, #3)	2003	April

References

External links

Board games introduced in 2002
Cheapass Games games